Play It Again Sports is a chain store in the United States that buys and sells used and new sporting goods. Started in 1983 by Martha Morris of Minneapolis, it later grew into several stores, and was sold by Morris to the Winmark Corporation in 1988. Franchising began in the same year, growing to over 400 stores in the United States and 43 in Canada. All stores are independently owned and operated.

References

External links
 

Retail companies established in 1983
1983 establishments in Minnesota
Sporting goods retailers of the United States
Sporting goods retailers of Canada
Companies based in Minneapolis